The Black Saint and the Sinner Lady is a studio album by American jazz double bassist, composer, and bandleader Charles Mingus. It was recorded on January 20, 1963, and released in July of that year by Impulse! Records. The album comprises a single continuous composition—partially written as a ballet—divided into four tracks and six movements. It is widely regarded as one of the greatest jazz records of all time.

Description
The album was recorded on January 20, 1963 by an eleven-piece band. Mingus has called the album's orchestral style "ethnic folk-dance music", and has been described by critics as blending "jazz and classical but also integrates elements of African music and Spanish themes." The album features liner notes written by Mingus and his then-psychotherapist, Edmund Pollock. The Black Saint and the Sinner Lady is often characterized by jazz and music critics as one of Mingus's two major masterworks (the other being Mingus Ah Um) and has frequently ranked highly on lists of the best albums of all time.

Bob Hammer was co-orchestrator and arranger for the album. In the book The Penguin Jazz Guide: The History of the Music in the 1000 Best Albums, Sue Mingus says: "In some fashion, Charles absorbed Bob Hammer's rehearsal band for a six-weeks gig he had at the Village Vanguard in 1963, which provided a unique opportunity to work out, night after night, one of his greatest compositions, The Black Saint and The Sinner Lady."

In the book Mingus Speaks, arranger Sy Johnson recollects: "Bob Hammer was very successful at that. He's a piano player, who was around here, in 1962 or something like that, when he did Mingus's masterpiece, as far as I concerned, a brilliant piece of orchestration and brilliant performance of The Black Saint and The Sinner Lady".

Reception

The Black Saint and the Sinner Lady is among the most acclaimed jazz records of the 20th century. Richard Cook and Brian Morton, writers of The Penguin Guide to Jazz, awarded the album a "Crown" token, the publication's highest accolade, in addition to the highest four-star rating. Steve Huey of AllMusic awards The Black Saint and the Sinner Lady five stars out of five and describes the album as "one of the greatest achievements in orchestration by any composer in jazz history." Q magazine describes the album as "a mixture of haunting bluesiness, dancing vivacity, and moments of Andalusian heat" and awards it four of five stars.

The album was included in Robert Dimery's 1001 Albums You Must Hear Before You Die.

Track listing

Personnel

Musicians
Charles Mingus – double bass, piano, composer
Jerome Richardson – soprano and baritone saxophone, flute
Charlie Mariano – alto saxophone
Dick Hafer – tenor saxophone, flute
Rolf Ericson – trumpet
Richard Williams – trumpet
Quentin Jackson – trombone
Don Butterfield – tuba, contrabass trombone
Jaki Byard – piano
Jay Berliner – Classical guitar
Dannie Richmond – drums
Bob Hammer – arranger

Production
Bob Thiele – production
Bob Simpson – engineering
Bob Ghiraldini – photography (cover and liner photos)
Joe Lebow – artwork (liner design)

References

Charles Mingus albums
1963 albums
Impulse! Records albums
Albums produced by Bob Thiele
Experimental big band albums